DiversityUNNC is a student society formed at The University of Nottingham Ningbo China in December 2014, and recognized officially in January 2015. It is formed by LGBTQIA students and alumni, as well as allies. It "aims at creating a diverse and respectful campus environment, free from discrimination and inclusive of all students, regardless of sexual orientation or gender identity"One of the main particularities of this society is the challenging context in which it is inserted: a hybrid space that characterizes a Sino-British University. Diversity's main activities are workshops and lectures, film and movie screening nights, weekly "Safe Space" support group meetings, and research and consulting.

History

In November 2014, realizing that The University of Nottingham Ningbo China (UNNC) was probably the only UK University that did not have a society focused on LGBTQIA issues, students and alumni decided to create one. The founders of Diversity are from a broad spectrum of different sexual orientations, gender identities, and gender expressions.

Diversity was officially recognized by UNNC on 31 of January 2015, after facing countless obstacles. In fact, Chinese students have previously tried to formally establish a similar group, but had their application rejected.

Structure

Objectives

 Increase awareness and understanding about sexual and gender diversity.
 Include and connect marginalized groups in the society.
 Establish a small-scale peer-support network.
 Provide information and resources to all students about welfare, wellbeing and sexual health.
 Collaborate with university professors conducting research on gender, sexuality, and diversity.
 Provide educational opportunities to students, staff, and campus community regarding issues concerning sexual and gender diversity.

See also
 LGBT rights in the People's Republic of China
 List of LGBT rights organizations

References

External links
 Diversity in Ningbo. Ningbo Guide Magazine, March 2015, pages 76–77
 Being a good ally: More than just accepting. Ningbo Guide Magazine, April 2015, pages 82–83
 Diversity Launches Nation's First ‘Safe Space’ Map in Ningbo. Ningbo Guide Magazine, June 2015, pages 48–49

LGBT rights in China
Student organizations established in 2014
2014 establishments in China